This is an incomplete list of the world's railway operating companies listed alphabetically by continent and country. This list includes companies operating both now and in the past.

In some countries, the railway operating bodies are not companies, but are government departments or authorities.
 
Particularly in many European countries beginning in the late-1980s, with privatizations and the separation of the track ownership and management from running the trains, there are now many track-only companies and train-only companies.

Africa

Railway unions 
Union of African Railways (UAR)
Southern African Railway Association (SARA), which represents:
CFB (Benguela railway, in Angola)
Botswana Railways
Caminhos de Ferro de Moçambique (CFM) (Mozambique Railway)
Malawi Railways
TransNamib
Swaziland Railway
TAZARA (Tanzania/Zambia Railway Authority)
Zambia Railways
National Railways of Zimbabwe
Tanzania Railways Corporation
Central East African Railway in Malawi
Beitbridge Bulawayo Railway
Metrorail (South Africa)
Spoornet (South-Africa)

Algeria
Algerian Railways (SNTF)

Angola
Benguela Railway
Moçâmedes Railway
Luanda Railway
Gunza-Gabala line

Benin
Benin Railways (Benirail & Bolloré Railways since 2014 )

Botswana
Botswana Railways (BR)

Burkina Faso
Abidjan-Niger Railway (SITARAIL)

Cameroon
Cameroon National Railways Authority (REGIFERCAM)

Côte d'Ivoire
Abidjan-Niger Railway (SITARAIL)

Republic of the Congo
Congo-Ocean Railway (CFCO)

Democratic Republic of the Congo (formerly Zaire)
Due to civil war, a significant portion of the railway system of the Democratic Republic of the Congo is not presently functioning.
Congo Railway (CNC)
Matadi-Kinshasa Railway

Djibouti
Ethio-Djibouti Railways

Egypt
Egyptian Railways

Eritrea
Eritrean Railway

Ethiopia
Ethio-Djibouti Railways

Gabon
Gabon State Railways (OCTRA)

Ghana
Ghana Railways & Ports (GRP) (Ghana's rail system is largely derelict)
Ghana Railway Company

Guinea
Guinea Railway

Kenya
Kenya Railways
Rift Valley Railways Consortium
Africa Star Railway Operation Company Limited

Lesotho
South African Railways (SAS/SAR)

Liberia
Bong Mining Co
Lamgo JV Operating Co

Madagascar
Madagascar Railways

Malawi
Malawi Railways (Central East African Railway)

Mali
Dakar-Niger Railway

Mauritania
S.N.I.M.

Morocco
Office National des Chemins de Fer (ONCF) : national railway office.

Mozambique
Mozambique State Railways
Beira Railroad Corporation

Namibia
TransNamib

Nigeria
Nigerian Railway Corporation

Senegal
Dakar-Niger Railway

South Africa
Passenger Rail Agency of South Africa
Transnet Freight Rail
Gautrain (Modern High Speed Trains)

Sudan
Sudan Railways
Gezira Light Railway

Eswatini
Eswatini Railways

Tanzania
Tanzania Railways Corporation
TAZARA Railway

Togo
Togo Railways (RCFT)
Although Togo has railways in place, no trains have run on them for many years.

Tunisia
Tunisian National Railways (SNCFT)

Uganda
Rift Valley Railways Consortium
Uganda Railways Corporation

Zambia
Zambia Railways
TAZARA Railway
Mulobezi Railway
Maamba Colliery Railway
Njanji Commuter Line

Zimbabwe
National Railways of Zimbabwe
Beitbridge Bulawayo Railway

(There are no railways in Burundi, Cape Verde, Central African Republic, Chad, Comoros, Equatorial Guinea, the Gambia, Guinea-Bissau, Mauritius, Niger, Rwanda, São Tomé and Príncipe, Seychelles, and Somalia.)

Asia

Afghanistan

 Afghanistan has only 24.6 km of railway which are railheads from neighbouring countries. Iran and Turkmenistan plan to help Afghanistan build a rail network that would enable Iran and Turkey to link up with Central Asia.

Bangladesh
Bangladesh Railway
Dhaka Mass Transit Company
Dhaka Metro Rail

Myanmar 
Myanma Railways

China (People's Republic of China-PRC)

China Railway (CR, 中国铁路 Zhōngguó Tiělù)
China Railway High-speed (CRH, 中国高速铁路 Zhōngguó gāosù tiělù)
Beijing-Shanghai High-Speed Railway Co. Ltd
Urban rail transit in China

Hong Kong (Hong Kong Special Administrative Region-HKSAR)

MTR
MTR Light Rail
 Peak Tram
 Hong Kong Tramways

Macau (Macau Special Administrative Region-RAEM)
Macau Light Rail Transit

India
Railway Operator
Indian Railways (IR)
Indian Railway Catering and Tourism Corporation (IRCTC)
High Speed Rail Corporation of India Limited (HSRC) 
Rail Vikas Nigam Limited (RVNL)
RITES (Rail India Technical and Economic Service)
Konkan Railway Corporation (KRC)
Container Corporation of India (CONCOR)
Urban Transit
Calcutta Tramways Company (CTC)
Kolkata Metro Rail Corporation (KMRC)
Delhi Metro Rail Corporation (DMRC)
National Capital Region Transport Corporation Ltd (NCRTC)
Mumbai Metro One Pvt Ltd (MMOPL)
Mumbai Metro Rail Corporation (MMRC)
Mumbai Railway Vikas Corporation (MRVC)
Noida Metro Rail Corporation Ltd. (NMRCL)
Chennai Metro Rail Limited (CMRL)
Rapid Metro Gurgaon Ltd. (RMGL)
Bangalore Metro Rail Corporation Limited (BMRCL)
Hyderabad Metro Rail Ltd. (HMRL)
Jaipur Metro Rail Corporation (JMRC)
Kerala Monorail Corporation Limited (KMCL)
Kochi Metro Rail Ltd (KMRL)
Lucknow Metro Rail Corporation Ltd (LMRCL)

Indonesia
Kereta Api Indonesia (Indonesian Railways / PT KAI)
Jakarta MRT (MRTJ)
Jakarta LRT (LRTJ)

Iran
Islamic Republic of Iran Railways
Asia Seir Aras Company
Rail Pardaz Seir Company
Railway Services and Technical Construction Engineering Company (RSTC Co.)
Raja Rail Transportation Company
Behtash Sepahan Rail Transportation Company (BTSCo)
Railway Transportation Company
Railways Installations & Constructions Engineering Company (Ballast)
Rail Tarabar Saba (Transportation)

Iraq
Iraqi Republic Railways (IRR)

Israel
Israel Railways
Carmelit - the world's smallest subway system, in Haifa
Cfir, constructing and operating the Jerusalem Light Rail
NTA, constructing and will operate the Tel Aviv Light Rail

Japan

Japan Railways Group (JR Group)

Jordan
Hedjaz Jordan Railway
Aqaba Railway Corporation

Kazakhstan
Qazaqstan Temir Zholy (Kazakhstan railways)

Lebanon
Lebanon State Railways

Malaysia

Freight, intercity and commuter rail
Keretapi Tanah Melayu Berhad (KTMB)
Malaysia Rail Link Sdn. Bhd.
MyHSR Corporation Sdn Bhd. 
Sabah State Railway (SSR)

Metro and rapid transit
Prasarana Malaysia - Rapid Rail Sdn Bhd
Mass Rapid Transit Corporation Sdn. Bhd.

Airport train
Express Rail Link Sdn. Bhd.

Mongolia
UBTZ (Ulaanbaatar Railways)

Nepal
Nepal Railways
Nepal Government Railway

North Korea  (Democratic People's Republic of Korea-DPRK)
 Korean State Railway

Pakistan
 Pakistan Railways (PR)
 Karachi Circular Railway (KCR)
There are few private companies offering private carrying.

Philippines

Philippine National Railways
Light Rail Transit Authority (Line 1 and Line 2)
Metro Rail Transit Corporation (Line 3)

Saudi Arabia
Saudi Railways Organization
Saudi Arabia Railways

Singapore

Main operators
SBS Transit (ComfortDelGro)
SMRT Trains (SMRT Corporation)
Other operators
Civil Aviation Authority of Singapore (Changi Airport Skytrain)
Wildlife Reserves Singapore (Jurong Bird Park Panorail)
Sentosa Development Corporation (Sentosa Express)

South Korea  (Republic of Korea-ROK)

 passenger/freight train
 Korail
 passenger train
 AREX
 subway
 Busan Transportation Corporation
 Daegu Metropolitan Subway Corporation
 Daejeon Express Transti Corporation
 Gwangju Metropolitan Rapid Transit Corporation
 Incheon Transit Corporation
 Korail
 Seoul Metro
 Seoul Metro Line9
 Seoul Metropolitan Rapid Transit Corporation
 NeoTrans Co. Ltd. (Shinbundang Line)
 Yongin Light Rail Corporation
 track management
 Korea Rail Network Authority
 signaling system
 Yookyung Control

Sri Lanka
Sri Lanka Railways

Syria
General Establishment of Syrian Railways
General Establishment of Al Hijaz Railway which runs Hejaz Railway

Taiwan  (Republic of China-ROC)
 Taiwan Railways Administration
 Taiwan High Speed Rail Corporation
 Taipei Metro
 Kaohsiung Mass Rapid Transit
 Taichung Metro

Thailand
State Railway of Thailand
S.R.T. Electrified Train Company Limited (SRT Red Lines train operator)
BTS skytrain (BTS, Bangkok Mass Transit: sky train operator)
Northern Bangkok Monorail Company Limited (MRT Pink Line train operator)
Eastern Bangkok Monorail Company Limited (MRT Yellow Line train operator)
MRT (BMCL, Bangkok Metro Company Limited: underground train operator)
Eastern High-Speed Rail Linking Three Airports Company Limited (Eastern Line HSR operator)

Turkmenistan
Demirýollary

Vietnam
Vietnam Railways

Europe

Union Internationale des Chemins de Fer

Albania
 HSH (Albanian Railways - Hekurudha Shqiptare)

Armenia
 South Caucasus Railway
 Yerevan Metro

Austria
 ÖBB (Austrian Federal Railways - Österreichische Bundesbahnen, till 1938 called BBÖ)
 STB (Stubai Valley Railway - Stubaitalbahn) :de:Stubaitalbahn
 StLB (Styrian Provincial Railways - Steiermärkische Landesbahnen) :de:Steiermärkische Landesbahnen
 MBS (Montafonerbahn Schruns, from Bludenz to Schruns) :de:Montafonerbahn
 GKB (Graz-Köflacher Eisenbahn) :de:Graz-Köflacher Eisenbahn
 LTE (Logistik- und Transport GmbH) :de:Logistik- und Transport GmbH
WESTbahn (WESTbahn Management GmbH)

Azerbaijan
 Passenger/freight train
 ADY (Azerbaijan Railways - Azərbaycan Dəmir Yolları)
 Subway
 Baku Metro (Bakı Metropoliteni)

Belarus
 Belarusian Railway - ,  Belarusian Railway website

Belgium
NMBS/SNCB (Belgian National Railways - Nationale Maatschappij der Belgische Spoorwegen / Société Nationale des Chemins de fer belges), abbreviated in Dutch/French.
Lineas
Thalys
Eurostar
Dillen & Le Jeune Cargo NV

Bosnia-Herzegovina
ŽFBH (Railways of the Federation of Bosnia and Herzegovina - Željeznice Federacije Bosne i Hercegovine)
ŽRS (Railways of Republika Srpska - Željeznice Republike Srpske)

Bulgaria
BDZh (Bulgarian State Railways - Български Държавни Железници, Bălgarski Dărzhavni Zheleznitsi)

Croatia
HŽ (Croatian Railways - Hrvatske željeznice)
 HŽ - Passenger Services ltd. - HŽ - Putnički prijevoz d.o.o.
HŽ - Cargo ltd. - HŽ - Cargo d.o.o.
HŽ - Infrastructure ltd. - HŽ - Infrastruktura d.o.o.

Czech Republic
SŽDC (Správa železniční dopravní cesty, s.o. - Railway Infrastructure Administration, state organization)
ČD (České dráhy, a.s. - Czech Railways)
ČDC (ČD Cargo, a.s.)
JHMD (Jindřichohradecké místní dráhy - Jindřichův Hradec Local Railways)
AWT (Advanced World Transport, a.s.)
UNIDO (Unipetrol Doprava, a.s.)
MTR (METRANS Rail, s.r.o.)
RJ (RegioJet, a.s.)
LEO (LEO Express, a.s.)
GWTR (GW Train Regio, a.s.)
CXM (Connex Morava, a.s.)
ODOS (Ostravská dopravní společnost, a.s.)
SDKD (SD - Kolejová doprava, a.s.)
CZL (CZ Logistics, s.r.o.)

Denmark

Current

State ownership 
DSB (Danish State Railways - Danske Statsbaner)
Banedanmark (Rail Net Denmark)

Public ownership 
Lokaltog (Local trains)
Nordjyske Jernbaner (North Jutland Railways)
Midtjyske Jernbaner (Central Jutland Railways)
Vestbanen (Western railway)
Aarhus Letbane (Aarhus Light Rail)
Odense Letbane (Odense Light Rail)
Hovedstadens Letbane (Greater Copenhagen Light Rail)
Metroselskabet (Metro company - Copenhagen Metro)

Private ownership 
Arriva Danmark
Keolis Danmark
Metro Service A/S
DB Cargo Scandinavia A/S
Contec Rail ApS

Former 

 GDS/HFHJ (Gribskovbanen / Hillerød-Frederiksværk-Hundested Jernbane)
 HHJ (Odderbanen (Hads-Ning Herreders Jernbane))
 HL (Capital City Local Railways - Hovedstadens Lokalbaner)
 HTJ/OHJ (Høng-Tølløse Jernbane / Odsherreds Jernbane)
 LJ (Lollandsbanen)
 LN (Lille Nord)
 LNJ (Lyngby-Nærum Jernbane)
 ØSJS (Eastern Railway - Østbanen (Østsjællandske Jernbaneselskab))
 VLTJ (Lemvigbanen (Vemb-Lemvig-Thyborøn Jernbane)). A popular song about the railway by Danish band Tørfisk is simply called VLTJ.

Estonia
CoalTerminalTrans Coal train operator to Muuga coal terminal (operated in 2006)
Edelaraudtee (passenger and freight; 1997–2014)
Eesti Raudtee (Estonian Railways, national railway company; privatized 2001, re-nationalized 2006–2007)
Elektriraudtee (Electric Railway, Tallinn suburban passenger railway; 1998–2013)
Elron (government-owned passenger train operator; 2013–)
Go Rail (named EVR Ekspress until 2006; Tallinn–Moscow passenger service operator; 1998–2015)
Põlevkivi Raudtee (Coal train operator to Narva Power Plants)
Raudteeinspektsioon (formerly Raudteeamet; Estonian Railway Inspectorate (regulator); 1999–)
Spacecom (freight train operator; 2004–)
Westgate Transport (Transoil, freight train operator)

Finland
Passenger services
Karelian Trains 
Pääkaupunkiseudun Junakalusto Oy
Suomen Lähijunat Oy
VR Group (VR Ltd—VR Oy)
Freight only
Fenniarail
Teollisuuden Raideliikenne Oy
North Rail Oy

France
Chemins de Fer de Provence (CFP) (operating  trains Nice–Digne)
Euro Cargo Rail
Getlink
SNCF (French National Railways - Société Nationale des Chemins de fer Français)
Chemins de fer de l'Est
Chemins de fer de l'État
Chemins de fer de l'Ouest
Chemins de fer du Nord
Chemins de fer de Paris à Lyon et à la Méditerranée
Chemins de fer de Paris à Orléans et du Midi
RATP (Paris Transport Authority - Régie Autonome des Transports Parisiens)
SNCB : services between Lille, its suburbs and Belgium
Eurostar : services between Alps, Marseille, Paris, Lille and London
Thalys : services between Alps, Marseille, Paris, Aachen, Brussel, Cologne, Amsterdam
Lyria : services between Montpellier, Marseille, Paris and Switzerland
Renfe : services between Paris, Lyon, Toulouse, Marseille, Barcelona and Madrid
Thello : services between Paris, Marseille, Nice, Milan, Torino and Venice
RDT13
Ouigo : services between Marseille, Montpellier, Lyon Airport and Disneyland Resort Paris
RTM : Marseille Public Transport Authority - Régie des Transports de Marseille
DB
CFL : services between Luxembourg and Volmerange-les-Mines.

Georgia
 Georgian Railway

Germany
*Deutsche Bahn (DB AG - German Railways 1992-) :de:Liste deutscher Eisenbahngesellschaften

Passenger railways 
 ABELLIO - Abellio GmbH :de:Abellio Rail
 ABG - Anhaltische Bahn Gesellschaft mbH :de:Dessau-Wörlitzer Eisenbahn-Gesellschaft (?)
 AKN - AKN Eisenbahn AG :de:AKN Eisenbahn
 ALEX - Allgäu-Express :de:Allgäu-Express
 AVG - Albtal-Verkehrs-Gesellschaft mbH :de:Albtal-Verkehrs-Gesellschaft
 BBG - Bahnbetriebsgesellschaft Stauden mbH
 BKD - Borkumer Kleinbahn und Dampfschiffahrt GmbH :de:Borkumer Kleinbahn
 BLB - Berchtesgadener Land Bahn
 BLB - Burgenlandbahn
 BayOB - Bayerische Oberlandbahn GmbH Bayerische Oberlandbahn
 BOB - Bodensee-Oberschwaben-Bahn GmbH :de:Bodensee-Oberschwaben-Bahn
 BSB - Breisgau-S-Bahn-Gesellschaft :de:Breisgau-S-Bahn
 BSEG - Brohltal Schmalspur-Eisenbahn Betriebs-GmbH
 BVO - Busverkehr Ober- und Westerzgebirge Bahn GmbH
 BZB - Bayerische Zugspitzbahn AG :de:Bayerische Zugspitzbahn
 CAN - Cantus Verkehrsgesellschaft
 CBC - City Bahn Chemnitz GmbH :de:Chemnitzer Verkehrs-Aktiengesellschaft & :de:Verkehrsverbund Mittelsachsen
 Chiemsee-Bahn :de:Chiemsee-Bahn
 CS - Connex Sachsen GmbH :de:Connex Sachsen
 DBG - Döllnitzbahn GmbH
 Drachenfelsbahn - Bergbahnen im Siebengebirge AG
 EB - Erfurter Bahn
 EGB - DBAG Erzgebirgsbahn :de:Erzgebirgsbahn
 EIB - Erfurter Industriebahn GmbH (historic)
 Eurobahn - Rhenus Keolis GmbH & Co. KG :de:Eurobahn
 EVB - Eisenbahnen und Verkehrsbetriebe Elbe-Weser GmbH :de:Eisenbahnen und Verkehrsbetriebe Elbe-Weser
 FEG - Freiberger Eisenbahngesellschaft mbH :de:Freiberger Eisenbahn
 FKE - Königstein Railway AG :de:Frankfurt-Königsteiner Eisenbahn
 FME - Franconian Museum Railway e.V. :de:Fränkische Museums-Eisenbahn
 GVG - Georgs-Verkehrs-GmbH
 HEX - HarzElbeExpress (Connex Sachsen-Anhalt GmbH) :de:Connex-Fernverkehr
 HLB - Hessische Landesbahn GmbH :de:Hessische Landesbahn
 HSB - Harzer Schmalspurbahnen
 HSB - Heidelberger Straßen- und Bergbahn AG
 HTB - Hellertalbahn GmbH :de:Hellertalbahn
 HzL - Hohenzollerische Landesbahn AG :de:Hohenzollerische Landesbahn
 IL - Inselbahn Langeoog Inselbahn Langeoog
 KHB - DBAG Kurhessenbahn :de:Kurhessenbahn
 KML - Kreisbahn Mansfelder Land GmbH
 Mecklenburgische Bäderbahn
 MBB - Mecklenburgische Bäderbahn Molli GmbH
 ME - Metronom Eisenbahngesellschaft mbB :de:Metronom Eisenbahngesellschaft
 MeBa - Mecklenburg Bahn GmbH
 NB - Nordseebahn :de:NordseeBahn
 NBE - Nordbahn Eisenbahngesellschaft mbH :de:Nordbahn (Schleswig-Holstein)
 NEB - Niederbarnimer Eisenbahn
 NEG - NEG Niebüll mbH (former NVAG) :de:Norddeutsche Eisenbahngesellschaft mbH (?)
 NOB - Nord-Ostsee-Bahn :de:Nord-Ostsee-Bahn
 NWB - NordWestBahn :de:NordWestBahn
 OBS - DBAG Oberweißbacher Berg- und Schwarzatalbahn :de:Oberweißbacher Berg- und Schwarzatalbahn
 ODEG - Ostdeutsche Eisenbahn
 OEG - Oberrheinische Eisenbahngesellschaft AG :de:Oberrheinische Eisenbahn
 OLA - Ostseeland-Verkehr GmbH (former MeBa/OME) :de:Ostseeland Verkehr
 OPB - Oberpfalzbahn :de:Oberpfalzbahn
 OSB - Ortenau-S-Bahn :de:Ortenau-S-Bahn
 PEG - Prignitzer Eisenbahn-Gesellschaft :de:Prignitzer Eisenbahn
 RBG - Regental Bahnbetriebe GmbH ("Länderbahn") Regentalbahn
 RBK - Regionalbahn Kassel GmbH :de:Regionalbahn Kassel
 Regio-Bahn GmbH
 RHB - Rhein-Haardt-Bahn GmbH :de:Rhein-Haardt-Bahn
 RNV - Rhein-Neckar-Verkehr GmbH :de:Rhein-Neckar-Verkehr
 RTB - Rurtalbahn GmbH & Co. KG (former DKB) :de:Rurtalbahn
 RüKB - Rügensche Kleinbahn GmbH & Co.
 Saarbahn GmbH :de:Saarbahn GmbH
 S S-Bahn Berlin GmbH
 SBB - Schweizerische Bundesbahn GmbH
 SBE - Sächsisch-Böhmische-Eisenbahn :de:Sächsisch-Böhmische Eisenbahngesellschaft
 SHB - Schleswig-Holstein-Bahn GmbH :de:Schleswig-Holstein-Bahn
 SHG - S-Bahn Hamburg GmbH
 SOB - DBAG SüdostBayernBahn :de:SüdostBayernBahn
 SOEG - Sächsisch-Oberlausitzer Eisenbahngesellschaft mbH :de:Verkehrsverbund Oberlausitz-Niederschlesien
 SSB - Stuttgarter Straßenbahnen AG :de:Stuttgarter Straßenbahnen
 STB - Süd-Thüringen Bahn :de:Süd-Thüringen Bahn
 STE - Strausberger Eisenbahn GmbH :de:Strausberger Eisenbahn GmbH
 SWEG - Südwestdeutsche Verkehrs AG :de:Südwestdeutsche Verkehrs AG
 TDR - Trans regio Deutsche Regionalbahn GmbH :de:Trans regio
 TE - Trossinger Eisenbahn :de:Trossinger Eisenbahn
 TL - Trilex
 UBB - Usedomer Bäderbahn :de:Usedomer Bäderbahn
 VBG - Vogtlandbahn GmbH :de:Vogtlandbahn
 VBK - Verkehrsbetriebe Karlsruhe :de:Verkehrsbetriebe Karlsruhe GmbH
 vectus - Vectus Verkehrsgesellschaft :de:Vectus
 VIAS - VIAS GmbH (Odenwald-Bahn) :de:VIAS GmbH
 ?? - Waldbahn
 WB - WestfalenBahn :de:WestfalenBahn
 WEBA - Westerwaldbahn GmbH :de:Westerwaldbahn des Kreises Altenkirchen GmbH
 WEG - Württembergische Eisenbahn-Gesellschaft :de:Württembergische Eisenbahn-Gesellschaft
 Wendelsteinbahn GmbH :de:Wendelsteinbahn
 WFB - DBAG WestFrankenBahn :de:WestFrankenBahn
 ??? - Zahnradbahn, Stuttgart

Historic state railways 
Deutsche Bundesbahn (DB - German Federal Railways)
Deutsche Reichsbahn (DR - East German Railways)
Deutsche Reichsbahn-Gesellschaft (DRB - German State Railways 1920–45)

Greece
TrainOSE and OSE (Greek Railways Organization - Οργανισμός Σιδηροδρόμων Ελλάδας, Organismós Sidirodrómon Elládas)
Rail Cargo Goldair (Private freight rail operator, joint venture with Rail Cargo Austria)

Hungary
Passenger services
MÁV (Hungarian State Railways - Magyar Államvasutak), Infrastructure manager
GySEV/ROeEE (Győr-Sopron-Ebenfurth Railway - Győr-Sopron-Ebenfurti Vasút / Raab-Oedenburg-Ebenfurter Eisenbahn - Hungaro-Austrian regional railway company), Infrastructure manager
Freight only
Rail Cargo Hungaria - formerly MÁV-Cargo
AWT RAIL HU (Subsidiary of Advanced World Transport Group)
MMV
Eurogate Rail Hungary (Hungarian private rail undertaking)

Iceland
Apart from a short line used in the construction of Reykjavik harbour in the early 20th century, there have never been any railways in Iceland.

Ireland
Iarnród Éireann - Irish Rail, part of CIÉ
Northern Ireland Railways

Italy
Alifana, operates, also as Metrocampania Nordest, in northern Campania region
ATM operates tramway routes in and around Milan, and the Milan Metro underground network
FAL, operates in Basilicata and Calabria regions
Metropolitana di Roma, Metro or Subway in Rome
FCU, operates in the Umbria region
Ferrovia Circumetnea, the local narrow-gauge line around Mount Etna
Bernina Railway, Linea del Bernina in italian, the local railway of the Bernina mountain range
Ferrovia Genova-Casella, a narrow-gauge line in Genoa
Ferrovie del Gargano, operates in the northern Apulia region
Ferrovie della Calabria, operates in the Calabria region
Ferrovie della Sardegna, operates narrow gauge lines in almost all of the island and region of Sardinia
Ferrovie dello Stato, or "FS", Italian State Railways, nationwide
Ferrovie del Sud Est, operates in the central and southern Apulia region
FNM, operates trains in Lombardy and Piedmont
FUC, operates Ferrovia Udine-Cividale in the Friuli region
GTT, operates in the Turin metropolitan area
LFI, operates in the Tuscany region
Met.Ro., operates Ferrovia Roma-Viterbo in the area of Rome
NTV, a private high-speed train operator
Ferrovia Adriatico Sangritana, operates in the Abruzzo region
SEPSA, operates the Cumana railway and the Circumflegrea railway in the Naples metropolitan area
SFSM, operates as Ferrovia Circumvesuviana narrow-gauge lines in the Naples metropolitan area
Sistemi Territoriali, operates in the Veneto region
TFT (the passenger division of LFI)
Trenitalia (passenger division of FS)
Trenitalia Tper operates trains in Emilia-Romagna
Trenord operates trains in Lombardy
Trentino trasporti, railway Ferrovia Trento-Malè and a bus company in the Province of Trento

Kazakhstan
Qazaqstan Temir Zholy (Kazakhstan railways)

Kosovo
Kosovo Railways (Kosovo Railways J.S.C - Hekurudhat e Kosovës Sh.A - Kosovske Železnice D.O.O.)

Latvia
LDz (Latvian Railway - Latvijas dzelzceļš - infrastructure manager)
Baltijas Ekspresis (Private rail company - Cargo Train)
Baltijas Tranzita Servis (Private rail company - Cargo Train)
LDz Cargo (Cargo Train)
Pasažieru Vilciens (Passenger Train)

Lithuania
LG (Lithuanian Railways - Lietuvos geležinkeliai)
ASG (Aukštaitijos narrow gauge railway - Aukštaitijos siaurasis geležinkelis)

Luxembourg
CFL (Luxembourg Railways - Chemins de Fer Luxembourgeois)

North Macedonia
MZ (Macedoniann Railways - Makedonski Zeleznici)

Malta
Malta Railway Company Limited (1883-1890)
Government of Malta (1892-1931)

Moldova
CFM (Moldovan Railway - Calea Ferată din Moldova)

Monaco
SNCF (French National Railways - Société Nationale des Chemins de fer Français)

Montenegro
Railways of Montenegro (Railways of Montenegro - Željeznica Crne Gore)

Netherlands
Nederlandse Spoorwegen (NS; English: "Dutch Railways")
NS International
Arriva Netherlands
Connexxion
Breng
Keolis Nederland
Qbuzz, operates on the MerwedeLingelijn

A few Dutch railway stations are served, even for journeys within the country, by foreign railway companies under the responsibility of NS. These companies are:
DB Regio, including DB Regionalbahn Westfalen and DB Euregiobahn
Prignitzer Eisenbahn, part of Arriva Germany
Abellio Rail NRW
National Railway Company of Belgium (NMBS/SNCB)

Cargo operators include:
 DB Cargo
 ACTS
 ERS Railways
 HSL Logistik
 RAIL4CHEM

Norway

Vy (current) (State owned)
Bane NOR (infrastructure) (State owned)
CargoNet (State owned)
Railcare Tåg (Swedish Rail Infrastructure Companies)
Airport Express Train (State owned) 
Hector Rail (Private Swedish freight rail carrier with permission to operate in Norway on certain lines )
Malmtrafikk (Owned by Swedish government under state owned mining company LKAB )
NSB Gjøvikbanen (State owned)
SJ (Swedish State Railroads)
Go-Ahead Norge (Private company)
Sporveien (Metro and trams in oslo)
Bybanen (light railway)
Green Cargo (Swedish state owned freight rail company)
Norske tog (state owned rolling stock manager)

Poland
Koleje Dolnośląskie (Lower Silesian Railways; KD) - Regional rail operator in the Lower Silesian Voivodeship.
Koleje Małopolskie (Lesser Poland Railways; KMAL) - Regional rail operator in the Lesser Poland Voivodeship.
Koleje Mazowieckie (Rail Mazovia; KMKOL) - Regional rail operator in the Masovian Voivodeship.
Koleje Śląskie (Silesian Railways; KSL) - Regional rail operator in the Silesian Voivodeship.
Koleje Wielkopolskie (Polish for Greater Poland Railways; KW) - Regional rail operator in the Greater Poland Voivodeship.
Łódzka Kolej Aglomeracyjna (Lodz Agglomeration Railway) - Commuter Rail operator based in Lodz, owned by the Voivodeship Government. 
PKP (Polskie Koleje Państwowe - Polish State Railways)
PKP Cargo
PKP Intercity
PKP LHS (broad-gauge line operator)
PKP PLK (infrastructure) 
Pomorska Kolej Metropolitalna - metropolitan rail owned by the Pomeranian Voivodeship
Przewozy Regionalne
Szybka Kolej Miejska (Tricity) (Szybka Kolej Miejska - S-Bahn type service in Poland's Tricity region)
Szybka Kolej Miejska (Warsaw)
Warszawska Kolej Dojazdowa
Arriva PCC - Consortium of PCC Rail and Arriva Polska won auction of passenger rail service on diesel lines in Kuyavian-Pomeranian Voivodship for 3 years (from December 2007)
CTL Logistics
Lotos Kolej
Orlen KolTrans
PCC Intermodal
PCC Rail Rybnik
PCC Śląskie Linie Kolejowe (infrastructure)
Trakcja Polska (building company)

Portugal

State Companies
CP (Portuguese Railways - Caminhos de ferro portugueses); Since 2004: Portuguese Trains - Comboios de Portugal
IP Infrastructure management; since 2015

State Subway Companies
Metro de Lisboa
Metro do Porto

Private Companies
Fertagus
Medway (formerly CP Carga)
Takargo (In partnership with COMSA)

Romania

State companies
Căile Ferate Române - State Railway Company

Private companies
Grup Feroviar Român
Unifertrans
Servtrans
Regiotrans
Cargo Trans Vagon
CTF
SAAF
Constantin Group
Rail Force
Sudarec
RollingStock
Via Terra
Express Forwarding

Private Company rail operator
Dori Trans
CET Suceava
CET Brașov
Termocentrala Deva-Mintia
AZOMURES
Bega Group
CefMur
Electro Comp Iași
Vitrometan Medias
Remarul 16 Februarie
Transferoviar Grup
Softrans
Transcombi
Trans Expedition Feroviar
SET CFR
Trans blue
Classfer

Light rail
Metrorex - Bucharest Metro rapid transit
RAT - Public transport including trams and light rail

Russia
RZhD (Russian Railways - Российские железные дороги, Rossiskiye Zheleznye Dorogi)
Freight One (Freight One - Первая Грузовая Компания, Pervaya Gruzovaya Companiya)
New Forwarding Company (Новая перевозочная компания)
Yamal Railway
Yakutian Railway
Crimea Railway

Serbia
 

Serbian Railways (ŽS) - Engineering, formerly single national railway company
Srbija Voz - Passenger transport
Srbija Kargo - Cargo transport
Serbian Railways Infrastructure - Infrastructure asset management

Slovakia
 ŽSR (Železnice Slovenskej Republiky - The Railways of the Slovak Republic, infrastructure manager)
 ZSSK (Železničná Spoločnosť Slovensko, a.s., passenger transport operator)
 ZSSKC (Železničná Spoločnosť Cargo Slovakia, a.s., freight transport operator)
 LTT (LTE Logistik a Transport Slovakia s.r.o.)
 SŽDS (Slovenská železničná dopravná spoločnosť, a.s.)

Slovenia
SŽ (Slovenian Railways - Slovenske železnice)
Adria Transport, First private railway company in Slovenia :de:Adria Transport

Spain

State Companies
Adif (Railway Infrastructure Manager - Administrador de Infraestructura Ferroviaria)
Renfe (Incumbent train undertaking - Broad and Standard Gauge)
Renfe Feve (Narrow Gauge Railways - Ferrocarriles de Vía Estrecha)
EuskoTren (Basque Railways - Eusko Trenbideak)
FGC (Catalan Government Railways - Ferrocarrils de la Generalitat de Catalunya)
FGV (Valencian Government Railways - Ferrocarrils de la Generalitat Valenciana)
SFM (Majorcan Railway Services - Serveis Ferroviaris de Mallorca)

Private Companies
Acciona Rail Services
ArcelorMittal Siderail
COMSA Rail Transport (now Captrain España)
Continental Rail
FS (Sóller Railway - Ferrocarril de Sóller)
Logitren
Low Cost Rail
Tracción Rail
Transfesa
Transitia Rail

Sweden
Arlanda Express
 Bergslagernas Järnvägar
BK Tåg
Transdev
Green Cargo
Hector Rail
MTR Express
MTR Stockholm
SJ (State Railways - Statens Järnvägar)
Skandinaviska Jernbanor
Tågkompaniet

Switzerland

AB (Appenzeller Bahnen, :de:Appenzeller Bahnen)
RHB (Rorschach-Heiden-Bahn)
RhW (Bergbahn Rheineck–Walzenhausen)
TB (Trogenerbahn, :de:Trogenerbahn)
ASm (Aare Seeland mobil) :de:Aare Seeland mobil
BC (Blonay–Chamby Museum Railway)
BDWM (BDWM Transport AG), merger of
BD (Bremgarten-Dietikon-Bahn)
WM (Wohlen-Meisterschwanden-Bahn)
BLM (Bergbahn Lauterbrunnen-Mürren)
BLS (BLS AG), merger of
BLS (Bern - Lötschberg - Simplon bahn)
RM (Regionalverkehr Mittelland AG :de:Regionalverkehr Mittelland)
EBT (Emmental-Burgdorf-Thun Bahn :de:Emmental-Burgdorf-Thun-Bahn)
BLT (Baselland Transport, :de:Baselland Transport)
BOB (Berner Oberland Bahnen), also owns
SPB (Schynige Platte Bahn)
BRB (Brienz Rothorn Bahn)
BVB (Basler Verkehrs-Betriebe)
CIS (Cisalpino), Train operating company
CJ (Chemins de fer du Jura :de:Chemins de fer du Jura)
Db (Dolderbahn, Zürich)
DFB (Dampfbahn Furka-Bergstrecke)
DVZO (Dampfbahn-Verein Zürcher Oberland), preserved line ex-SBB
FART (Ferrovie autolinee regionali ticinesi)
FB (Forchbahn)
FLP (Ferrovia Lugano-Ponte Tresa)
FW (Frauenfeld-Wil-Bahn :de:Frauenfeld-Wil-Bahn)
GGB (Gornergrat-Monte Rosa-Bahnen)
JB (Jungfraubahn)
KLB (Kriens-Luzern-Bahn), short freight line until December 2009, remaining infrastructure to Zentralbahn
LEB (Chemin de fer Lausanne-Echallens-Bercher)
LO (Métro Lausanne-Ouchy)
MBC (Transports de la région Morges-Bière-Cossonay), was before
BAM (Chemin de fer Bière-Apples-Morges :de:Chemin de fer Bière-Apples-Morges)
MG (Monte Generoso Railway)
MGB (Matterhorn-Gotthard-Bahn) (merger between FO and BVZ)
BVZ (BVZ Zermatt-Bahn ex Brig - Visp - Zermatt Bahn)
FO (Furka Oberalp Railway)
MIB (Meiringen-Innertkirchen Bahn), owned by KWO (Kraftwerke Oberhasli)
MOB (Chemin de fer Montreux-Oberland Bernois)
MVR (Transports Montreux-Vevey-Riviera)
NStCM (Chemin de fer Nyon-St-Cergue-Morez :de:Chemin de fer Nyon-Saint Cergue-Morez)
OeBB (Oensingen-Balsthal-Bahn)
PB (Pilatusbahn)
RB (Rigi Railways)
VRB (Vitznau-Rigi-Bahn (see Rigi-Bahnen))
RBS (Regionalverkehr Bern-Solothurn, :de:Regionalverkehr Bern-Solothurn)
RhB (Rhätische Bahn / Viafier retica)
RiT (Riffelalp Tramway)
SBB CFF FFS (Swiss Federal Railways - Schweizerische Bundesbahnen - Chemins de fer fédéraux - Ferrovie federali svizzere)
SEFT (Società Esercizio Ferroviario Turistico operating Ferrovia Mesolcinese)
SOB (Schweizerische Südostbahn AG :de:Schweizerische Südostbahn)
BT (Bodensee Toggenburg Bahn)
ST (Sursee-Triengen railway)
SVB (Städtische Verkehrsbetriebe Bern, "Bernmobil", :de:Bernmobil)
SZU (Sihltal Zürich Uetliberg Bahn)
THURBO (THURBO), passenger operation, also successor of
MThB (Mittelthurgau-Bahn)
TMR (Transports de Martigny et Régions)
MC (Martigny-Châtelard)
MO (Martigny-Orsières)
TN (Transports publics du littoral neuchatelois)
TPC (Transports Publics du Chablais (merger of AL, AOMC, ASD and VB)
AL (Aigle-Leysin Bahn (see TPC))
AOMC (Aigle-Ollon-Monthey-Champéry (see TPC))
ASD (Aigle-Sépey-Diablerets (see TPC))
BVB (Bex-Villars-Bretaye) (see TPC)
TPF (Transports publics Fribourgeois)
GFM (Chemins der fer Fribourgeios (Gruyére-Friburg-Morat))
TPG (Transports Publics Genevois)
TRAVYS (Transports Vallée de Joux - Yverdon-les-Bains - Ste-Croix)
OC (Orbe-Chavornay)
PBr (Chemin de fer Pont-Brassus)
YSC (Chemin de fer Yverdon - Ste-Croix)
TRN (TRN SA for "Transports publics neuchâtelois")
TSOL (société du tramway du sud-ouest lausannois S.A.)
VBG (Verkehrsbetriebe Glattal)
VBZ (Verkehrsbetriebe Zürich)
WAB (Wengernalpbahn)
WB (Waldenburgerbahn, :de:Waldenburgerbahn)
WSB (Wynental- und Suhrentalbahn)
ZB Zentralbahn (2005 merger of the Luzern-Stans-Engelberg-Bahn and the Swiss Federal Railways' Bruenigbahn)
LSE (Luzern-Stans-Engelberg-Bahn)

Turkey
TCDD (TCDD - Turkiye Cumhuriyeti Devlet Demiryolları)
İstanbul Ulaşım A.Ş. (operating subways in city of Istanbul)
İZBAN (operating commuter trains in city of İzmir)
TUVASAS (Turkish wagon industry)
TULOMSAS (Turkish Locomotiveand Engines industry)
TUDEMSAS (Turkish carriage wagon industry)
EUROTEM (Railway Vehicles Industry and Trade Joint Stock Company)
SİTAŞ (Sivas Sleeper Manufacturing Industry and Trade Joint Stock Company)
RAYSİMAŞ (Rail Systems Engineering, Consultancy Joint Stock Company)
VADEMSAŞ (Voestalpine Kardemir Railway Systems Industry and Trade Joint Stock Company)

Ukraine
UZ (Ukrainian Railway - Укрзалізниця, Ukrzaliznytsia)

United Kingdom
 See List of railway companies involved in the 1923 grouping
See List of companies operating trains in the United Kingdom.
Abellio Greater Anglia / Stansted Express
Arriva Rail London
Arriva Trains Wales
Avanti West Coast
British Railways
CrossCountry
c2c
Chiltern Railways
East Midlands Railway
Eurostar
Getlink
Govia Thameslink Railway
Grand Central
Great Western Railway
Heathrow Express
Hull Trains
London North Eastern Railway
London Underground
Merseyrail
Northern Trains
ScotRail
South Western Railway
Southeastern
Transport for Wales
TransPennine Express
Tyne & Wear Metro
West Midlands Trains

Vatican City
FS, Italian State Railways
Trenitalia (Passenger division of FS)

Latin America and the Caribbean

Argentina
Trenes Argentinos (SOFSE) (2013)
Administración de Infraestructuras Ferroviarias Sociedad del Estado (Part of Trenes Argentinos, infrastructure division)
Tren Patagonico

Freight operators
Trenes Argentinos (TACyL, Trenes Argentinos Cargas y Logística) is the state-run company operating the Belgrano, San Martín, and Urquiza freight lines. 
Ferrosur Roca - (FR) Operates most of the former Roca division of FA.
Nuevo Central Argentino - (NCA) Operates former Mitre division of FA.
Ramal Ferro Industrial Río Turbio - (RFIRT).  See also Rio Turbio Railway.

Suburban operators
Ferrovías -  operates services over Linea Belgrano Norte.
Metrovias -  operates services over Linea Urquiza and also operates the Buenos Aires Metro
Trenes Argentinos (formerly known as Ferrocarriles Argentinos, Nuevos ferrocarriles argentinos and SOFSE) operates most of the suburban lines in Argentina, including the Roca line, the Sarmiento line, the Mitre line, the South Belgrano line, the San Martín line and the Tren de la costa line in Buenos Aires metro area. It also operates suburban lines in Resistencia, Chaco, Paraná, Entre Ríos, and Neuquén, Neuquén. Currently, another suburban rail system is being built in Córdoba. 
Sociedad de Transporte de Mendoza is a company run by the government of the city of Mendoza that currently operates the suburban light rail and tram system of that city and the city of Godoy Cruz.

Long distance and regional passenger operators
Trenes Argentinos (formerly known as Ferrocarriles Argentinos, Nuevos ferrocarriles argentinos and SOFSE) operates almost every long distance and regional train in Argentina. 
Tren Patagonico is a company run by the government of the province of Río Negro. It currently operates two lines.

Belize
 (There are no longer any railways in Belize)
 Stann Creek Railway (closed in 1937 - see Rail transport in Belize)

Bolivia
Empresa Nacional de Ferrocarriles (ENFER) (Bolivia National Railways, 1996 split and partly privatized)
Empresa Ferroviaria Andina (FCA) (Western railway network)
Ferroviaria Oriental S.A. (FO) (Eastern railway network, 50% owned by Genesee & Wyoming)

Brazil
Rede Ferroviária Federal SA (RFFSA)
América Latina Logística SA (ALL)
MRS Logística (MRS)
Ferrovia Centro Atlântica (FCA) (Controlled by Vale)
Companhia Ferroviária do Nordeste (CFN) (Controlled by Companhia Siderúrgica Nacional)
Companhia do Metropolitano de São Paulo (Metrô-SP) (the state owned company responsible for rapid transit in the state of São Paulo, except for lines 4, 5 and 6)
Companhia Paulista de Trens Metropolitanos (CPTM) (the state owned company responsible for the commuter trains in the state of São Paulo)
ViaQuatro (CCR S.A.) (private owned company responsible for operation of rapid transit Line 4 of São Paulo)
ViaMobilidade (CCR S.A.) (private owned company responsible for operation of rapid transit Line 5 of São Paulo)
Linha Universidade (Acciona) (private owned company responsible for construction and operation of rapid transit Line 6 of São Paulo)
Supervia (the privately owned company responsible for the commuter trains in the state of Rio de Janeiro)
Companhia Brasileira de Trens Urbanos (CBTU) (the state owned company responsible for the commuter trains in several states)
Ferronorte (controlled by Brasil Ferrovias holding, from 2006 to ? was bought by the company América Latina Logística SA (ALL))
Novoeste (controlled by Brasil Ferrovias holding, from 2006 to ? was bought by the company América Latina Logística SA (ALL)))
Ferroban (controlled by Brasil Ferrovias holding, from 2006 to ? was bought by the company América Latina Logística SA (ALL)))

Those lines were always privately owned:
Estrada de Ferro Vitória a Minas (EFVM) (Controlled by Vale)
Estrada de Ferro Carajás (EFC) (Controlled by Vale)

Chile

Empresa de los Ferrocarriles del Estado (EFE) Chilean State Railways
 FEPASA, Chilean Freight Operation Concession on the broad gauge lines in the south
 TRANSAP, Chilean Freight Operation Concession on the broad gauge lines in the south
 Ferronor FERRONOR, Chilean Freight Operation Concession on the meter gauge lines in the north
 FCALP, Chilean Freight Operation Concession on the meter gauge lines in the north
 FCAB, Chilean Freight Operation Private company on the meter gauge lines in the north
 Sociedad Química y Minera,  gauge line from Maria Elena to Tocopilla

Colombia
Ferrocarriles Nacionales de Colombia (National Railways of Colombia)

Costa Rica
Instituto Costarricense de Ferrocarriles (INCOFER), llamado antes de 1991 FECOSA (Ferrocarriles de Costa Rica)
National Atlantic Railroad Formerly called Northern Railway Company before being taken by Costa Rican government
Pacific Electric Railroad

Cuba
Ferrocarriles Nacionales de Cuba (Cuban National Railways)

Ecuador
Empresa de Ferrocarriles Ecuatorianos (Ecuador State Railways)

Falkland Islands
Camber Railway (1915 - 1920s/1940)

Guatemala
Ferrocarriles de Guatemala (FEGUA) (Guatemala Railway) - see Rail transport in Guatemala

Guyana

Haiti

Compagnie des Chemins de Fer de Port-au-Prince, January 17, 1878 - April 1888
Société des Tramways de Port-au-Prince, April 18, 1897–1901 (purchased by Compagnie des Chemins de Fer de la Plaine du Cul-de-Sac)
Chemin de Fer Central (owned by Haitian American Sugar Company/Hasco) 1915–1932(?)
Compagnie des Chemins de Fer de la Plaine du Cul-de-Sac 1896–1950s(?)
Compagnie Nationale (Compagnie de Fer Nationale?/Haitian National Railroad?) 1905–1940s(?) (probably purchased by Société Haitiano-Américaine de Développement Agricole/SHADA in 1940s)

Honduras
Ferrocarril Nacional de Honduras
Vaccaro Railway
Tela Railroad
Here are some pictures and information on Ferrocarril Nacional de Honduras http://www.fahrplancenter.com/FCNacionalHondurasEntry.html

Jamaica
Jamaica Railway Corporation (See Transport in Jamaica)

Mexico
Línea Coahuila Durango
Ferrocarril Chiapas-Mayab
Ferrocarril del Istmo de Tehuantepec
Ferrocarril y Terminal del Valle de México
Ferrosur
Ferromex
Ferroviaria y Abastecedora del Pacifico
Kansas City Southern de México, wholly owned by the Kansas City Southern Railway which both operate together as one.
Ferrocarriles Nacionales de Mexico (FNM) (formerly FNM)
Ferrocarril Sonora-Baja California (SBC)

Nicaragua
 (There are no longer any railways in Nicaragua)
Ferrocarril del Pacifico de Nicaragua (Pacific Railway of Nicaragua)
see some pictures on http://www.fahrplancenter.com/NicaraguaTitel.html

Panama
Panama Canal Railway
Chiriqui National Railroad
Bay Line Railroad de Panama

Paraguay
Ferrocarril Presidente Carlos Antonio Lopez (President Carlos Antonio Lopez Railway)

Peru
Empresa Nacional de Ferrocarriles del Peru (ENAFER) (Peruvian National Railways)

El Salvador
Ferrocarriles Nacionales del Salvador (FENADESAL) (National Railways of El Salvador)

Suriname
Suriname Government Railway

Uruguay
Administración de Ferrocarriles del Estado (AFE)  (State Railways Administration).

Venezuela
Instituto Autónomo de Ferrocarriles del Estado (IAFE)  (Venezuela National Railways)
Ferrominera Orinoco C.A.

North America

Canada 

 Canadian National Railway
 Canadian Pacific Railway
 GO Transit
 Via Rail
 Ontario Northland
 Rocky Mountaineer
 White Pass and Yukon Route
 New Brunswick Southern Railway
 Quebec North Shore and Labrador Railway
 Quebec Gatineau Railway
 Tshiuetin Rail Transportation
 Great Western Railway (Saskatchewan)
 Hudson Bay Railway (1910)
 Hudson Bay Railway (1997)
 Huron Central Railway
 Ottawa Valley Railway
 Ontario Southland Railway
 Southern Ontario Railway
 Réseau de transport métropolitain
 West Coast Express
 Urban transit
 OC Transpo (Ottawa)
 Société de transport de Montréal (Montreal)
 Toronto Transit Commission (Toronto)
 Calgary Transit (Calgary)
 Edmonton Transit Service (Edmonton)
 Metro Vancouver (Vancouver)
Lake line Railway (Manitoba)

Mexico 

 Ferromex
 Kansas City Southern de Mexico (KCSM)
 Ferrosur
 Ferrovalle
 Ferrocarriles Nacionales de Mexico
 Ferrocarril Sonora-Baja California

United States 

 Airlake Terminal Railway
 Alabama and Florida Rail Road Company
 Alaska Railroad
 Amtrak
 AN Railway 
 Arizona & California Railroad
 Baltimore and Ohio Railroad
 BHP Nevada Railroad
 BNSF Railway
 Brightline
 Burlington Northern Railroad
 Burlington Junction Railway
 California High-Speed Rail
 Caltrain
 Chesapeake and Ohio Railway
 Central Pacific Railroad
 Chicago, Burlington and Quincy Railroad
 Chicago and North Western Transportation Company
 Chicago South Shore and South Bend Railroad
 Conrail (Consolidated Rail Corporation)
 CSX Transportation
 Dakota, Minnesota and Eastern Railroad
 Durango and Silverton Narrow Gauge Railroad
 Florida East Coast Railroad
 Genesee & Wyoming
 Great Northern Railroad
 Iowa, Chicago and Eastern Railroad
 Iowa Interstate Railroad
 Kansas City Southern Railway
 Lake State Railway
 Louisville and Nashville Railroad
 MARC Train
 Metra
 Metrolink
 Metro Transit
 Metropolitan Transportation Authority
 Miami Metrorail
 Milwaukee Road (Chicago, Milwaukee, St. Paul and Pacific Railroad)
 Missouri Pacific
 Mobile and Girard Railroad
 Mobile and Montgomery Railroad Company
 Mobile and Montgomery Railway Company
 Mobile and Ohio Railroad
 Montana Rail Link
 Montgomery and West Point Railroad
 Nevada Northern Railway
 New York and Atlantic Railway
 New York Central Railroad
 New York, New Haven and Hartford Railroad
 Nickel Plate Road
 Norfolk Southern Railway
 Norfolk and Western Railway
 PATH
 Pennsylvania Railroad
 Pensacola and Louisville Railroad Company
 Pensacola Railroad
 Providence & Worcester Railroad
 Santa Fe Railroad
 Southern Pacific Transportation Company
 South Shore Line
 St. Croix Valley Railroad
 SunRail
 Tacoma Rail
 Tri-Rail
 Union Pacific Railroad
 Washington Department of Transportation
 Western Maryland Railway
 Western Pacific Railroad
 Wheeling and Lake Erie Railway (1916–1988)
 Wheeling and Lake Erie Railway (1990)
 Wisconsin and Southern Railroad

Oceania

Australia

 Pacific National
 SCT Logistics
 Aurizon
 One Rail Australia
 Southern Shorthaul Railroad
 TasRail
 Qube Holdings
 V/Line
 NSW TrainLink
 Journey Beyond
 Bowmans Rail
 Transwa
 Queensland Rail
 Metro Trains Melbourne
 Sydney Trains
 Adelaide Metro

New Zealand
 New Zealand Railways Department NZR or NZGR (to 1981)
 New Zealand Railways Corporation (Rail operator 1981  1990, land owner 19902003, Ontrack 2003–2008, railway land owner 2008  present)
 New Zealand Rail Limited (Defunct, privatised 1993, renamed Tranz Rail in 1995)
 Tranz Rail (Defunct, brought out by Toll New Zealand in 2003)
 Toll New Zealand (Defunct, brought out by Government 2008)
 KiwiRail (formed 2008)
 Transdev Auckland (2004 - 2022)
 Auckland One Rail (2022 - )
 Dunedin Railways (formerly Taieri Gorge Railway)
 New Zealand Midland Railway Company (to 1890s)
 Sanson Tramway (to 1945)
 Wellington & Manawatu Railway Company (to 1908)

See also

References 

 
Lists of transport companies
Rail transport-related lists